Ab Tak Chhappan is a 2004 Indian Hindi-language action film directed by Shimit Amin. It was written by Sandeep Shrivastava and produced by Ram Gopal Varma. It starred Nana Patekar in the lead role. It also starred Revathi, Yashpal Sharma, Mohan Agashe, Nakul Vaid, and Hrishitaa Bhatt in supporting roles.

The story revolves around Inspector Sadhu Agashe (Nana Patekar) from the Mumbai Encounter Squad famous for having killed 56 people in police encounters. A film without any songs, it is inspired by the life of Police sub-Inspector with Mumbai Police force Daya Nayak. The film was premiered at the New York Asian Film Festival. Times Internet released a first-person shooter game titled Fatal Encounter as a tie-in to the film.

The film released theatrically on 27 February 2004. In 2012, Rediff.com included the film in its list of the top 25 Hindi action films of all time. A sequel Ab Tak Chhappan 2 was directed by Aejaz Gulab.

Plot
The section of the Mumbai Police Department responsible for handling the underworld, known as Crime Branch, is headed by Sadhu Agashe (Nana Patekar). Sadhu is the city's best inspector with an enviable reputation and record of an encounter with shootings. Though challenging, he is a loving husband to his wife (Revathi) and father and also helps his informers and other poor people in times of need. His immediate junior, Imtiyaz Siddiqui (Yashpal Sharma), despises Sadhu to no end; he feels Sadhu intentionally belittles him. Also, Imtiyaz is more concerned about adding to his encounter score and therefore ends up killing more than the primary target, which is the main reason Sadhu dislikes him. To add to his woes, Imtiyaz is unable to surpass Sadhu's encounter "score". Enter Jatin (Nakul Vaid), a rookie to this line of policing who manages to impress Sadhu. The inspector takes the newcomer under his wing, further antagonizing Imtiyaz.  All of them report to the Commissioner Pradhan (Mohan Agashe), who is a fair and honest police officer.

During these events, Sadhu establishes a love-hate friendship on the phone with Zameer (Prasad Purandare), a notorious underworld don based abroad, who grudgingly admires Sadhu for his no-nonsense attitude. Zameer and rival don, Rajashekhar, run the Mumbai underworld.

Sadhu Agashe's world begins to turn upside down as Pradhan retires and with the entrance of the new commissioner, M P Suchak (Jeeva) who has a strong link with the don, Rajashekhar. Suchak takes a liking towards Imtiyaz, who is willing to do encounters primarily with Zameer's men, mainly on Rajashekhar's orders. Suchak starts undermining and belittling Sadhu. Sadhu continues on his righteous path. Eventually, the pressures of his career take a toll on his personal life as some men kill his wife in the Jatin and Vaishali's wedding reception party. During his personal investigation into this matter, Sadhu kills Feroz, the right-hand man of Rajashekhar. Sadhu is compelled to resign from the force, and Suchak (on Rajashekhar's orders) sends Imtiyaz to kill Sadhu. Imtiaz gets killed in a peculiar chain of events, and Sadhu Agashe, a once famed inspector, becomes a fugitive of the law. Suchak announces shoot at sight orders against Sadhu despite Pradhan's advice to the contrary, and Sadhu is forced to ask Zameer for help in escaping from India.

Meanwhile, Jatin, who has been growing increasingly disenchanted by Suchak's behaviour, resigns and calls for a press conference and exposes Suchak's connection with Rajashekhar. Suchak disputes this in his press conference but is suspended pending the investigation.

Sadhu goes to Zameer's HQ and thanks to him for releasing him and tells him that he is now Zameer's man. As Zameer and Sadhu are drinking alone, Sadhu breaks a glass. Sadhu accuses Zameer of killing his wife. When Zameer tells Sadhu that it is Feroz who killed his wife, Sadhu informs him that he had killed Feroz earlier, and hence he was convinced that using Feroz's name, Zameer had murdered Sadhu's wife. Suddenly, Sadhu uses the broken glass to kill Zameer and escapes. Then the scene rolls forward to a location abroad where Sadhu and Pradhan are having coffee. When Pradhan asks Sadhu about why he had run away, thereby proving the allegations against him, Sadhu tells him that it is part of his plan. He was able to kill Zameer as a fugitive which he could never have done as a cop. He says that he will now go to Rajashekhar since Rajashekhar is thrilled at Zameer's death and kill him too. Sadhu says that he doesn't care what the world thinks of him, and he will always be a cop and will continue his work of eliminating crime until he dies. He requests Pradhan to look after his son, who is with his maternal aunt in Pune, and Pradhan contemplatively agrees. The end credits roll as Sadhu gets up and walks off after saying good bye to Pradhan.

Cast

Nana Patekar as Inspector Sadhu Agashe
Yashpal Sharma as Sub-Inspector Imtiaz Siddiqui
Prasad Purandare as Zameer, underworld don
Nakul Vaid as Sub-Inspector Jatin Shukla
Kunal Vijaykar as Sub-Inspector Francis Alvarez
Jeeva as Joint Commissioner M P Suchak
Revathi as Nameeta Agashe, Sadhu Agashe's wife
Tanmay Jahagirdar as Aman Agashe, Sadhu Agashe's son
Ravi Kale as Corporator Velankar
Hrishitaa Bhatt as Vaishali, Jatin's wife (Special appearance)
Parvez Fazal Khan as Feroz
Dr. Mohan Agashe as Ex-Commissioner Pradhan
Pravin Patil as Sub-Inspector Narayan
Dibyendu Bhattacharya as Nazrul, Zameer's henchman
Anant Jog as Sawant
Shaikh Shami Usman as Joshi
Ajay Rohilla as Vinod, Police informer
Pankaj Saraswat as Pappu, Police informer
Megan Cocks as Melinda, Zameer's moll
Dinesh Lamba as Rafiq
Amrish as Vilas
Vijay as Rasool
Ashok Kumar Beniwal as RAW Officer
Adil Rana as a Police officer
Amin Merchant as Wadia
Santosh Tiwari as a servant

Awards
BFJA Award for Best Actor (Hindi) – Nana Patekar
Zee Cine Awards
Best Background score – Salim and Sulaiman Merchant – Won
Best Publicity Design – Leo Entertainment – Won
Best Producer – Ram Gopal Varma – Nominated

References

External links
 
 

2004 films
2000s Hindi-language films
2004 action drama films
2004 action thriller films
2004 crime drama films
2004 crime thriller films
2000s crime action films
Hindi-language action films
Indian action drama films
Indian action thriller films
Indian crime drama films
Indian crime thriller films
Indian crime action films
Indian avant-garde and experimental films
Indian police films
Films about corruption in India
Hindi films remade in other languages
Fictional portrayals of the Maharashtra Police
2000s avant-garde and experimental films
Films directed by Shimit Amin